The Godhra train burning occurred on the morning of 27 February 2002: 59 Hindu pilgrims and karsevaks returning from Ayodhya were killed in a fire inside the Sabarmati Express near the Godhra railway station in the Indian state of Gujarat. The cause of the fire remains disputed. The Gujarat riots, in which Muslims were the targets of widespread and severe violence, occurred shortly afterward.

The Nanavati-Mehta commission, appointed by the state government in the immediate aftermath of the event, concluded in 2008 that the burning was a pre-planned arson committed by a thousand-strong Muslim mob. The Banerjee commission, instituted by the Ministry of Railways, characterized the fire as an accident in 2006: however, the Gujarat High Court found its appointment to be unconstitutional and quashed all findings. An independent investigation by a non-governmental organization also supported the theory of the burning being an accident. Scholars remain skeptical about the claims of arson.

In February 2011, the trial court convicted 31 Muslims for the burning, relying extensively on the Nanavati-Mehta Commission report as evidence. In October 2017, the Gujarat High Court upheld the convictions.

27 February 2002 incident 

In February 2002, thousands of devotees of Rama (known as "Ramsevaks" or "Kar Sevaks") had gone from Gujarat to Ayodhya at the behest of the Vishva Hindu Parishad to take part in a ceremony called the Purnahuti Maha Yagna. On 25 February, 1,700 people, a mix of pilgrims and karsevaks boarded the Sabarmati Express, which was bound for Ahmedabad. On 27 February 2002, the train made its scheduled stop at Godhra about four hours late, at 7:43 am. As the train started leaving the platform, someone pulled the emergency brake, and the train stopped near the signal point. The driver of the train later stated that the chain had been pulled multiple times, judging by the instruments in his cabin.

Then, according to one narrative, the train was attacked by a mob of around 2,000 people. After some stone-pelting, four train coaches were set alight, trapping many people inside. 59 people, including 27 women and 10 children, were burnt to death, and 48 others were injured. According to J Mahapatra, additional director general of the Gujarat police, "miscreants had kept the petrol-soaked rags ready for use much before the train had arrived at Godhra". In September 2008, the Nanavati-Mehta Commission submitted the part of its report covering the Godhra train burning incident (Part I) in which it had concluded that burning of the S-6 coach of Sabarmati Express near Godhra railway station was a "planned conspiracy".

The cause of the fire is disputed. In 2003, the Concerned Citizens Tribunal concluded that the fire had been an accident. Several other independent commentators also concluded that the fire itself was almost certainly an accident, saying that the initial cause of the conflagration was never conclusively determined. Historian Ainslie Thomas Embree stated that the official story of the attack on the train—that it was organized and carried out by people under orders from Pakistan—was entirely baseless. Scholar Martha Nussbaum has also challenged this narrative, stating that several inquiries have found that the conflagration was the result of an accident rather than a planned conspiracy.

Inquiries

Forensic Science Laboratory Report
A study conducted by the Gujarat Forensic Science Laboratory report states that the fire was due to the inflammable liquid emptied by the attackers into the coach. Furthermore, the fire got initiated from inside, and as a result, there was less scorching on the outside of the coach below the windows.

Nanavati-Mehta commission

Appointment 
On 6 March 2002, the Gujarat government set up a commission of inquiry to investigate the incident and submit a report, the chairman and sole member of which was retired Gujarat High Court judge K G Shah. However, Shah's alleged closeness to Narendra Modi generated fierce criticism from the victims, human rights organisations, and political parties, and led to a demand for the appointment of a Supreme Court judge to the commission. As a result, the government reconstituted the commission into a two-member committee, appointing retired Supreme Court judge G T Nanavati to lead the commission, which thus became known as the "Nanavati-Shah Commission".

Shah died in March 2008, just a few months before the committee submitted its first report, and the Gujarat High Court then appointed retired judge Akshay Kumar Mehta to the committee on 6 April 2008. The commission, during its six-year probe, examined more than 40,000 documents and the testimonies of more than 1,000 witnesses. The initial term of the committee was three months long; however, it received 22 extensions, till June 2014, to submit its final report.

Report
In September 2008, the commission submitted the "Part I" of the report dealing with the Godhra incident, in which it supported the theory originally propounded by the Gujarat police. Maulvi Husain Haji Ibrahim Umarji, a cleric in Godhra, and a dismissed Central Reserve Police Force officer named Nanumiyan were presented as the "masterminds" behind the operation. The evidence marshalled by the committee in favour of this conclusion was a statement made by Jabir Binyamin Behra, a criminal in custody at the time, although he later denied giving any such statement. In addition, the alleged acquisition of 140 litres of petrol hours before the arrival of the train and the storage of the petrol at the guest house of Razzak Kurkur, accused of being a key conspirator, and forensic evidence showing that fuel was poured on the train coach before it burnt, was presented by the committee. The report concluded that thousands of Muslims from the Signal Falia area attacked the train.

Reactions
The Communist Party of India (Marxist) and the Indian National Congress objected to the exoneration of the Gujarat government by the commission, citing the timing of the report (with general elections months away) as evidence of unfairness. Congress spokesperson Veerappa Moily commented on the strange absolvement of the Gujarat government for complacency for the carnage before the commission's second and final report had been brought out. The CPI(M) said that the report reinforced communal prejudices. The commission has been heavily criticised by academics such as Christophe Jaffrelot for obstructing the course of justice, supporting the conspiracy theory too quickly, and for allegedly ignoring evidence of governmental complicity in the incident.

Banerjee investigation

Appointment and report

On 17 May 2004, with the victory of the United Progressive Alliance (UPA) in the Indian general election, Lalu Prasad Yadav was appointed railway minister. In September 2004, two and half years after the train burning, Yadav appointed former Supreme Court Justice Umesh Chandra Banerjee to investigate the incident. In January 2005, Banerjee presented his interim report, which tentatively ascribed the fire as an "accidental fire" after ruling out other theories. He cited a forensic report stating that the injuries on the victims were only compatible with an "internal fire." The report was also critical of the railways' handling of the evidence relevant to the case.

High Court judgment 
Banerjee's findings were challenged in the Gujarat High Court by Neelkanth Tulsidas Bhatia, who was injured in the incident. In October 2006, the court quashed the conclusions of Banerjee. It ruled that the investigation was "unconstitutional, illegal and null and void", declared its formation to be a "colourable exercise of power with mala fide intentions", and its argument of accidental fire "opposed to the prima facie accepted facts on record." The High Court also directed that the report should not be tabled in the Parliament.

Reactions
The BJP, which was then in the opposition in the union parliament, dismissed the report as an attempt to gain an advantage in the Bihar elections, which were to be held soon. It welcomed the High Court judgement, saying that it was a setback for the Congress. Lalu Prasad Yadav, then the minister for railways, cited the report as proof that the Narendra Modi government had organized the riots that followed, and called it an exposure of the BJP.

Trial and court verdict

Arrests
By 28 February 2002, 51 people had been arrested for the incident on charges of arson, rioting, and looting. On 17 March 2002, a chief suspect Haji Bilal, a local town councillor and a Congress worker, was captured by an anti-terrorist squad in Godhra. The FIR had alleged that a 1540-strong mob attacked the Sabarmati Express on 27 February, minutes after the delayed train left the Godhra station on the day of the incident. The president of Godhra municipality, Mohammed Hussain Kalota, was arrested in March. Others arrested included corporators Abdul Razak and Shiraj Abdul Jamesha. Bilal was also alleged to have a connection with gang leader Latif and was reported to have visited Karachi in Pakistan several times.

The SIT filed the charge-sheet before first class railway magistrate P. K. Joshi, which ran to more than 500 pages, stated that 59 people were killed in the S-6 coach of Sabarmati Express when a mob of around 1540 unidentified people attacked it near Godhra railway station. The 68 people accused in the charge-sheet included 57 accused of stoning and torching the train. The charge-sheet also stated that a mob attacked the police, prevented the fire brigade from approaching the burning train, and stormed the train for a second time. Eleven others were charged with being part of this mob. Initially, 107 people were charged, five of whom died while the case was still pending in court. Eight others were juveniles who a separate court tried. As many as 253 witnesses were examined during the trial, and over items of 1500 documentary pieces of evidence were presented to the court.

On 24 July 2015, the prime accused in the Godhra case, Hussain Suleman Mohammad, was arrested by the Godhra crime branch from Jhabua district of Madhya Pradesh. On 18 May 2016, a previously missing 'conspirator' of the event, Farooq Bhana, was arrested in Mumbai by Gujarat Anti-Terrorist Squad. On 30 January 2018, Yakub Pataliya (63) was arrested from Godhra by a team of B Division police in the town after they received a tip-off that he was spotted in a locality.

Prevention of Terrorism Act and trial
On 3 March 2002, The Prevention of Terrorism Ordinance (POTO) was invoked against all the accused, which was later suspended due to pressure from the Central government. On 9 March 2002, Police added Criminal Conspiracy to the charges. In May 2003, the first charge sheet was filed against 54 accused, but they were not charged under the Prevention of Terrorism Act (POTA). In February 2003, the POTA was re-invoked against all the accused after the BJP retained control of the Gujarat legislature in the 2002 assembly elections.

In November 2003, the Supreme Court of India stayed the trial. In 2004, the POTA was repealed after the United Progressive Alliance (UPA) came to power, prompting it to review the invocation of the POTA against the accused. In May 2005, the POTA review commission decided not to charge the accused under POTA. This was later unsuccessfully challenged by a victim's relative before the Gujarat High Court and later on appeal before Supreme Court. In September 2008, the Nanavati Commission submitted its report on the incident. In 2009, after accepting the Special Investigation Team (SIT) report, the court appointed a special fast-track court to try the case and established five other fast-track courts to try the post-incident riots. The bench hearing the case also said public prosecutors should be appointed in consultation with the SIT chair. It ordered that the SIT would be the nodal agency for deciding about witness protection and also asked that it file supplementary charge sheets and that it may cancel the bail of the accused. More than 100 people were arrested in relation to the incident. The court was set up inside the Sabarmati Central Jail, where almost all accused were confined. The hearing began in May 2009. Additional Sessions Judge P R Patel was designated to hear the case.

In May 2010, Supreme Court restrained the trial courts from pronouncing judgement in nine sensitive riot cases, including the Godhra train incident. The trial was completed in September 2010; however, the verdict could not be delivered because of the Supreme Court's stay. The stay was lifted in January 2011, and the judge announced that he would pronounce the judgement on 22 February 2011.

Court verdict
In February 2011, the trial court convicted 31 people and acquitted 63 others, saying the incident was a planned conspiracy. The convictions were based on the murder and conspiracy provisions of Sections 302 and 120B of the Indian Penal Code respectively, and under Sections 149, 307, 323, 324, 325, 326, 332, 395, 397, and 436 of the Code and some sections of the Railway Act and Police Act. The death penalty was awarded to 11 convicts; those believed to have been present at a meeting held the night before the incident where the conspiracy was formed, and those who, according to the court, had entered the coach and poured petrol before setting it afire. Twenty others were sentenced to life imprisonment.

Maulvi Saeed Umarji, who was believed by the SIT to be the prime conspirator, was acquitted along with 62 other accused for lack of evidence. The convicted filed appeals in the Gujarat High Court. The state government also challenged the trial court's decision to acquit 61 persons in the High Court and sought death sentences for 20 convicts awarded life imprisonment in the case.

Gujarat High Court verdict 
In October 2017, accepting the prosecution's contention that there was a conspiracy behind the incident, the Gujarat High Court commuted the death sentence of 11 convicts to life imprisonment while upholding the earlier life sentence of 20 others. Thus, all the 31 accused who were convicted earlier in 2011 by the SIT court were given life imprisonment. while, 63 others who were acquitted in 2011 by the trial court, were re-acquitted by the high court, including the alleged mastermind. The court ordered the state government and the railways to pay  compensation to the families of each of the 59 victims.

Reactions to the SIT investigation 
BJP spokesperson Shahnawaz Hussain stated, "The theory propagated by the (central) government and some NGOs (Non-Governmental Organization) has been proved wrong...." Law Minister Veerappa Moily (a Congress Party member) said it was premature to comment and that the courts will take their own course. R. K. Raghavan, who was the head of the Special Investigation Team, said he was satisfied with the verdict. BJP spokesperson Ravi Shankar Prasad said the verdict had exposed the nefarious designs of the UPA government, which tried to cover up the entire episode.

In popular culture
 Chand Bujh Gaya, a 2005 film, uses the Godhra train burning incident as the background for a love story.
 The 2013 film Kai Po Che! had the Gujarat riots as a backdrop for the main narrative. It was based on the novel The 3 Mistakes of My Life written by Chetan Bhagat.
 The 2004 documentary Final Solution depicts the train burning and the Gujarat riots that followed.

See also
 Best Bakery case
 Naroda Patiya massacre

Notes

References

Bibliography

External links
 Report By The Commission of Inquiry Consisting of Mr. Justice G.T. Nanavati And Mr. Justice Akshay H. Mehta 
 Detailed Report on the Godhra riots by the Concerned Citizens Tribunal

Conflicts in 2002
Mass murder in 2002
Arson attacks on vehicles
History of Gujarat (1947–present)
Massacres in India
Violence against Hindus in India
2002 crimes in India
2002 Gujarat riots
Arson in India
Railway accidents and incidents in Gujarat
Persecution by Muslims
21st-century Hinduism
February 2002 events in Asia
Train and rapid transit fires